Victor Jansson (21 January 1887 – 4 February 1944) was a Swedish footballer who played as a forward. He was part of the Djurgården Swedish champions' team of 1912 and 1915. Jansson made one appearance for Sweden in a friendly against Hungary in 1913.

Honours 
Djurgårdens IF
 Svenska Mästerskapet: 1912, 1915

References

1887 births
1944 deaths
Swedish footballers
Association football forwards
Djurgårdens IF Fotboll players
Sweden international footballers